Sarny urban territorial hromada is a hromada of Ukraine, located in the country's western Rivne Oblast. Its capital is the city of Sarny.

Settlements 
The hromada consists of one city (Sarny), as well as 35 villages:

History 
On 15 January 2023, the Sarny urban hromada was one of nine hromadas in Rivne Oblast to receive a bus and humanitarian aid from German bus company Meso and More. According to Vitaliy Koval, Governor of Rivne Oblast, the bus was given to local educational institutions for transportation of students and teachers.

References 

2020 establishments in Ukraine
Hromadas of Rivne Oblast